Centaurea cyanoides, the Syrian cornflower, is a species of Centaurea. It is native to Cyprus, Israel, Jordan, Lebanon, and Syria.

Centaurea cyanoides looks similar to the European cornflower Centaurea cyanus although C.cyanoides is much smaller, only 2-3 cm wide, grow only in wild area and not in cultivated fields and native to the Middle East.

References

cyanoides